Usehat is a town and a nagar panchayat in Badaun district in the Indian state of Uttar Pradesh. It is a town in usawan block.

Geography
It has an average elevation of 152 metres (498 feet).

Demographics
 India census, Usehat had a population of 12,183. Males constitute 53% of the population and females 47%. Usehat has an average literacy rate of 32%, lower than the national average of 59.5%: male literacy is 39%, and female literacy is 23%. In Usehat, 23% of the population is under 6 years of age.

References

Cities and towns in Budaun district